Spider lily is the common name for a number of different plant species within the family Amaryllidaceae which belong to the following genera:

 Crinum, a genus of about 180 species of perennial plants in the family Amaryllidaceae found along the sides of streams and lakes in tropical and subtropical areas worldwide, including South Africa
 Hymenocallis, a genus of plants in the family Amaryllidaceae
 Lycoris, a genus of 13–20 species of flowering plants in the family Amaryllidaceae, formerly often treated in the family Liliaceae
 Nerine, a genus of about 20–30 species of South African plants in the family Amaryllidaceae